Mili Pictures Worldwide is a feature film animation company based in Shanghai, China. The company's first film, Dragon Nest: Warriors' Dawn, based on the online game Dragon Nest, was released in China in July 2014. The company opened an office in Los Angeles, California in spring 2014, headed by producer Bill Borden (producer of High School Musical and other films). The company's next feature project, Ping Pong Rabbit, is currently in pre-production in Los Angeles. Ping Pong Rabbit is being directed by Mike Johnson, who was nominated for the 2005 Academy Award for Best Animated Feature as co-director (with Tim Burton) of Corpse Bride.

Filmography
 2014: Dragon Nest: Warriors' Dawn
 2015: The Three Little Pigs and the Lamp
 2016: Throne of Elves
 2017-2018: Shen Qi Huan Qi Tan
 2019: Ping Pong Rabbit
 TBA: Dogtanian and the Three Muskehounds (co-production with BRB Internacional)

References

External links
 
 
 
 

Chinese animation studios
Chinese companies established in 2012
Companies based in Shanghai
Film production companies of China